Arsenic & Old Lace is a 1962 television film directed by George Schaefer and starring Tony Randall, Dorothy Stickney, and Mildred Natwick. It first aired during season 11 of the NBC anthology series Hallmark Hall of Fame. It is an adaptation of Joseph Kesselring's 1939 play Arsenic and Old Lace.

The story is a black comedy in which drama critic Mortimer Brewster (Randall) discovers that his elderly aunts Abby and Martha (Stickney and Natwick respectively) have been poisoning their lonely male guests.

Boris Karloff reprised his role as Jonathan Brewster (who is described by the other characters as resembling the Frankenstein star), which he had originated on Broadway. He had been unable to appear in Frank Capra's 1944 film due to a scheduling conflict, but had played Jonathan on television once before, in a 1955 adaptation for the CBS anthology series The Best of Broadway.

Karloff and director Schaefer had previously performed the play during World War II, touring Pacific islands such as Kwajalein to entertain troops for Special Services. Karloff reportedly tried to cajole Schaefer into playing the role of Teddy in the television adaptation as well, but he declined and the part went to Tom Bosley.

Cast

Reception
Arsenic & Old Lace was well-received by critics, who called it "a fine, frolicsome TV adaptation" and "a well polished gem of a performance". Director Schaefer was praised for returning the focus of the story to the sisters Abby and Martha, as it had been in the play, rather than emphasizing Mortimer's romantic subplot, as had been the case in the 1944 film.

References

External links
 

1962 television films
1962 films
American black comedy films
American films based on plays
Television remakes of films
Hallmark Hall of Fame episodes
Films directed by George Schaefer
American drama television films
1960s American films